The 1914 New Zealand tour rugby to Australia was the eighth tour by the New Zealand national team to Australia. Seven matches were played against regional sides along with three Test match between the two national teams. 

New Zealand won the test series v. Australia with three victories.

Touring party 
Manager: R.M. Isaacs
Captain: Dick Roberts

Match summary
Complete list of matches played by the All Blacks in Australia: 

 Test matches

References 

New Zealand tour
tour
New Zealand national rugby union team tours of Australia